Chilo cinnamomellus is a moth in the family Crambidae. It was described by Carlos Berg in 1875 and is found in Argentina.

References

Chiloini
Moths described in 1875